The 2021 Challenger Eckental was a professional tennis tournament played on carpet courts. It was the 25th edition of the tournament which was part of the 2021 ATP Challenger Tour. It took place in Eckental, Germany between 1 and 7 November 2021.

Singles main-draw entrants

Seeds

 1 Rankings are as of 25 October 2021.

Other entrants
The following players received wildcards into the singles main draw:
  Marvin Möller
  Max Hans Rehberg
  Mats Rosenkranz

The following player received entry into the singles main draw using a protected ranking:
  Julian Lenz

The following players received entry from the qualifying draw:
  Johannes Härteis
  Christopher Heyman
  Tobias Simon
  Henri Squire

The following players received entry as lucky losers:
  Alexander Erler
  Lucas Miedler
  Aldin Šetkić

Champions

Singles

 Daniel Masur def.  Maxime Cressy 6–4, 6–4.

Doubles

  Roman Jebavý /  Jonny O'Mara def.  Ruben Bemelmans /  Daniel Masur 6–4, 7–5.

References

2021 ATP Challenger Tour
2021
2021 in German tennis
November 2021 sports events in Germany